Ardashir II was the ruler of the Bavand dynasty from 1238 to 1249. His grandmother was a sister of Rustam V, and he was also related to the Nizari Ismaili Jalaluddin Hasan through his mother.

Biography 
In 1238, Ardashir restored Bavand rule in Mazandaran, and assumed the traditional Bavand title of ispahbadh. He died in 1249, and was succeeded by his son Muhammad.

Sources
 
 

13th-century Bavandid rulers
1249 deaths
Year of birth unknown